Beaver Creek is a tributary of the Clinch River in Knox County in East Tennessee. It flows from northeast to southwest from the Gibbs High School area, through the Halls, Powell, Karns, Solway, and Hardin Valley communities, entering the Clinch downstream from Solway.
Beaver creek is the site of the new Knox county water trail. When completed it will allow over 40 miles of navigable water by kayak or canoe.
The Beaver Creek Kayak Club is a local float club that is dedicated to the clean up, preservation and promotion of the beaver creek watershed.

See also
List of rivers of Tennessee

References

Rivers of Tennessee
Tributaries of the Tennessee River
Rivers of Knox County, Tennessee